The Patti Grace Smith Fellowship is a non-profit program in the United States that provides paid internships, scholarships, and executive mentorship to exceptional Black undergraduate students seeking a career in aerospace. The fellowship is named after Patricia Grace Smith, a United States Federal Aviation Administration (FAA) official whose regulatory work helped lay the foundations for commercial spaceflight. The program was founded in her honor in 2020.

Motivation and overview 
The Patti Grace Smith Program seeks to connect exceptional Black students with the resources needed to begin their careers in aerospace, with the goal of increasing the visibility, participation, and retention of Black students in order to diversify the historically homogeneous aerospace industry.

This program's mission is directly inspired by Smith, who at age 16 served as a plaintiff in the landmark Supreme Court case that integrated public schools in Alabama. She graduated from Tuskegee University with a bachelor's degree in 1969 and went on to work for the U.S. Senate Commerce Committee, U.S. Department of Defense, and the Federal Communications Commission. Smith joined the Office of Commercial Space Transportation and rose to the position of Chief of Staff and then to Associate Administrator of the U.S. Federal Aviation Administration (FAA). She was appointed by President Obama to serve on the NASA Advisory Council and the advisory board of the Smithsonian’s National Air and Space Museum.

Smith fostered the growth of the nascent commercial space industry through deregulation, with the construction of the Mojave Air & Space Port and 2004 flight of SpaceShipOne occurring under her tenure. According to Elon Musk, Smith "helped lay the foundations for a new era in American spaceflight.”

The fellowship was founded by NASA Astronaut B. Alvin Drew, Virgin Galactic engineer Khristian Jones, NASA Marshall Space Flight Center lead engineer Tiffany R. Lockett, and Virgin Orbit Vice President William Pomerantz in 2020. It is closely modeled after the Brooke Owens Fellowship.

The program offers students their first paid summer internship at top space companies (including SpaceX, Blue Origin, Virgin Galactic, etc.), travel stipends, and mentorship from notable Black aerospace leaders, including former NASA administrators (e.g. Charles Bolden), astronauts (e.g. Robert Curbeam), academics (e.g. Daniel E. Hastings), and company executives. Fellows are also paired with peer mentors and are flown out to the annual summit in Washington, D.C. to network and meet industry leaders.

Alumni 
As of 2022, the Patti Grace Smith Fellowship has 111 alumni across three cohorts hailing from 50+ different universities, including Ivy League colleges, HBCUs, community colleges, and major public universities.

Each year, hundreds of students from around the United States apply. Approximately forty are selected through a holistic evaluation of merit, passion for aerospace, and community involvement. This is done primarily by means of interviews and essay responses, with academic achievement and volunteer activities also weighted. Finalists are matched with host companies, who independently conduct interviews and award offers.

Inaugural Class of 2021 
 Amanial Abraham, (MIT) — Venturi Astrolab
 Alina Ampeh, (University of Illinois, Urbana-Champaign) — Sierra Nevada Corporation
 Jesudunsin Awodele, (Georgia Tech) — Boeing
 Alexandria Baca, (University of Central Florida) — Virgin Galactic
 Loubensky Baine, (University of Central Florida) — BlackSky
 Kojo Bekoe-Sakyi, (Georgia Tech) — Airbus U.S. Space & Defense
 Quintarius Bell, (University of Miami) — Relativity Space
 Isaac Broussard, (MIT) — Axiom Space
 Alexis Burris, (University of Maryland) — Northrop Grumman
 Megan Bynoe, (Rutgers University) — Relativity Space
 Lauren Carethers, (MIT) — Space Capital
 Elias Hailu Daniel, (University of Maryland) — ABL Space Systems
 Jeremiah Davis, (Calhoun Community College) — SpaceX
 Joshua Kennedy Davis, (UT Austin) — Airbus U.S. Space & Defense
 Kailen De Saussure, (Georgia Tech) — General Dynamics
 Taliyah Emory-Muhammad, (University of Southern California) — Masten Space Systems
 Mya Guillaume, (Pennsylvania State University) — Maxar
 Amanda Gutiérrez-Nieves, (University of Puerto Rico) — ABL Space Systems
 Noah Herbert, (Purdue University) — Ball Aerospace
 Niya Hope-Glenn, (Howard University) — First Mode
 Junia Janvier, (Boston University) — Aerospace Corporation
 Megan Jordan, (UA Huntsville) — Hermeus
 Hermon Kaysha, (MIT) — First Mode
 Andre Ketter, (Southern Methodist University) — Bryce Space and Technology
 Nehemiah Key, (Ohio State University) — L3Harris
 Kyle Kingsberry, (Embry-Riddle Aeronautical University) — Blue Origin
 Kirk McLean Jr., (University of Maryland) — L3Harris
 Zion Moss, (Purdue University) — SpaceX
 Donovan N’Gum, (North Carolina State University) — Virgin Orbit
 Myles Noel, (MIT) — Relativity Space
 Ciarra Ortiz, (Georgia Tech) — MIT Media Lab
 Isaac Owen, (Princeton University) — Joby Aviation
 Jovanna Patterson, (Georgia Tech) — Venturi Astrolab
 Anaelle Roc, (Pomona College) — Relativity Space
 Bria Romero, (Rice University) — United Launch Alliance
 Nyima Sanneh, (Texas A&M University) — HawkEye 360
 Chelsea Slater, (Embry-Riddle Aeronautical University, University of Florida) — Aerospace Industries Association
 Melford Spiff-Rufus, (Princeton University) — SpaceX
 Jenesis Tucker, (Embry-Riddle Aeronautical University) — Joby Aviation
 Shalayah-Naomi Webb, (San Diego City College) — Draper Laboratory
 Brandon Wells, (San Diego State University) — SpaceX
 Paden Wright, (Tuskegee University) — Maxar
 Simone Williams, (Yale University) — Ball Aerospace

Class of 2022 
 Abdifatah Ali, (University of Cincinnati) — Virgin Orbit
 Alexis Horton, (University of Nebraska) — Northrop Grumman
 Aliya Belay, (Rice University) — First Mode
 Amani Toney, (Embry-Riddle Aeronautical University) — Boeing
 Armand Destin, (Purdue University) — Space Capital
 Bille Daniel, (University of Notre Dame) — Maxar
 Chancellor Charles-Halbert, (Mississippi State University) — United Launch Alliance
 Christian Reid, (Embry-Riddle Aeronautical University) — First Mode
 David Di-Benedetto, (UT Austin) — Hermeus
 De’Ashley Spain, (Old Dominion University) — Maxar
 Elijah McCoy, (Fullerton College) — BlackSky
 Elijah Simpson, (University of Michigan) — Northrop Grumman
 Elizabeth Antoine-Hands, (West Valley Community College) — Relativity Space
 Garrett Robinson, (MIT) — Relativity Space
 Harrison Jenkins, (Lehigh University) — iSpace
 Jalen Cauley, (Georgia Tech) — L3Harris
 Jarrett Davis, (Alabama A&M) — ABL Space Systems
 Jonathan Hope, (Pennsylvania State University) — Blue Origin
 Jordan Martin, (Rice University) — Hermeus
 Juanitta Bekoe, (Syracuse University) — Ball Aerospace
 Justin Connors, (Georgia Tech) — Airbus
 Justin Pemberton, (Georgia Tech) — Lynk
 Kaleigh Ray, (University of Southern California) — Venturi Astrolab
 Kay Perkins, (Georgia Tech) — Bryce Space and Technology
 Kendra Rivers, (Suffolk County Community College) — Draper
 Liam (Johnson) Hunte, (Embry-Riddle Aeronautical University) — HawkEye 360
 Madison Newbell, (Embry-Riddle Aeronautical University)
 Malia Mitchell, (Howard University) — SpaceX
 Max Starr, (Ohio State University) — MIT Media Lab
 Maya Benson from Columbia, (Embry-Riddle Aeronautical University) — SpaceX
 Miles Oglesby, (MIT) — Astranis
 Muyiwa Arowolo, (Purdue University) — Sierra Nevada Corporation
 Robert Boykin, (Embry-Riddle Aeronautical University) — Joby Aviation
 Sala Ba, (Stanford University) — Blue Origin
 Savyon Stokes, (University of Maryland) — HawkEye 360
 Suraya John, (Georgia Tech) — SpaceX
 Talal Gbamgbola, (UT Austin) — Virgin Orbit
 Trinity Taylor, (North Carolina State University) — USNC-Tech
 Vincent Redwine, (University of Chicago) — USNC-Tech

Class of 2023 
 Amadou Wade, (University of Maryland) — Zipline
 Andrew Pierre-Antoine, (Embry-Riddle Aeronautical University) — Airbus
 Anisa Hill, (George Mason University) — Relativity Space
 Ayomikun Gbadamosi, (Princeton University) — ABL Space Systems
 Christal Biney, (University of Houston) — Bryce Space and Technology
 Denzel Ekes, (Harvard University) — Hermeus
 Edward Siaw, (Princeton University) — Northrop Grumman
 Emily Burrus, (Embry-Riddle Aeronautical University) — Blue Origin
 Gbemitireoluwa Daramola, (University of Maryland) — Ursa Major
 George Cicero, (Boston University) — iSpace
 Irwin J. Alcantara, (University of Puerto Rico) — Gravitics
 Janae Jordan, (Embry-Riddle Aeronautical University) — Bryce Space and Technology
 Jayden Christmas, (North Carolina A&T) — Redwire
 Jesus Wilkins, (UC Berkeley) — Outpost Space
 Lordina O. Mensah, (University of Kentucky) — Venturi Astrolab
 Mariyah Ndiaye, (UT Austin) — Redwire
 Marvellous Achugbu, (University of Maryland) — SpaceX
 Maya Kinyatta Tyson, (Spelman College, Georgia Tech) — Joby Aviation
 McKenna McMurray, (Harvey Mudd College) — Lockheed Martin
 Meredith Clark, (Purdue University) — Astroscale
 Mezie Nwizugbo, (University of Southern California) — SpaceX
 N’kira Brooks, (New York University) — Astroscale
 Nathan Evans, (Harvard University) — Ball Aerospace
 Nicholas Olibrice, (University of New Hampshire) — Barrios Technology
 Paris Garrett, (Texas Southern University) — Axiom Space
 Raven Warner, (UA Birmingham) — United Launch Alliance
 Sana’i Parker, (Drexel University) — SpaceX
 Stanley Tucker, (Embry-Riddle Aeronautical University) — HawkEye 360
 Taj Lee, ( UT Austin) — Virgin Orbit
 Xavier Goewey, (Embry-Riddle Aeronautical University) — SNC
 Zach Conti, (Saint Louis University) — Ursa Major

References

Non-profit organizations based in Seattle
2020 establishments in Washington (state)